Zavodskoye is a village (selo) in Troitsky District of Altai Krai, Russia.

Rural localities in Troitsky District, Altai Krai